Safarnama is an Indian Hindi-language travel documentary television series produced by Sinashh Films that has aired on Epic TV since August 2020. The show is hosted by television actor Ankit Siwach and is based on his travel journey starting from Mumbai and ending in Ladakh, covering other parts of India in between.

Episodes 
Episode 01 - Mumbai
Episode 02 - Manali, Himachal Pradesh
Episode 03 - Kullu
Episode 04 - Kullu Part-02
Episode 05 - Sarchu and Leh
Episode 06 - Leh and Ladakh - 01
Episode 07 - Leh and Ladakh - 02
Episode 08 - Turtuk and Thang
Episode 09 - Kargil

Source:

Production 
The show was produced by Sinashh films and Siwach, and was shot on location in the various places shown in the series through a road trip. Siwach relating himself as an avid traveler described the show as a personal journey he wanted highlight for viewers.

Broadcast 
It has aired in India on the Epic TV television channel and is also available on its online streaming service Epic ON.

References

External links

Indian television series
Indian travel television series
2020 Indian television series debuts
Hindi-language television shows
Epic TV original programming